Cochylimorpha kohibabae is a species of moth of the family Tortricidae. It is found in Afghanistan.

References

K
Endemic fauna of Afghanistan
Moths of Asia
Moths described in 2005
Taxa named by Józef Razowski